Blayne Ryan Heckel (born March 20, 1953) is an American experimental physicist, known for his research involving precision measurements in atomic physics and gravitational physics. He is now a professor emeritus at the University of Washington in Seattle.

Education and career
At Harvard University he graduated with an A.B. in 1975 and a Ph.D. in 1981. His doctoral dissertation was supervised by Norman Ramsey. Heckel became an assistant professor in 1983, an associate professor in 1987, and a full professor in 1991 at the University of Washington, where he was temporarily head of the physics department. Heckel founded there with Eric Adelberger in 1986 a group for experimental gravitational physics (Eöt-Wash Group), which Jens H. Gundlach joined in 1990. They further developed torsion balances in the style of Eötvös and used them to study the possible deviation of the gravitational force from Newton's  law at small distances  (up to 50 micrometers). The Eöt-Wash group searched for possible new fundamental forces involving a fifth force, large extra dimensions, or the effects of dark matter and dark energy, as well possible violations of the equivalence principle at small distances. Heckel and his colleagues also used the torsion balance to test Lorentz invariance with polarized electrons and to look for new spin-dependent forces.

In the 1980s his research dealt with experimental atomic physics, including searches for violations of parity and violation of time reversal invariance, by means of measuring upper limits for the electric dipole moment of atoms such as 199Hg. He worked with his doctoral advisor Norman Ramsey, among others.

Heckel and his colleagues also measured the coupling constants of the weak interaction of neutrons with nucleons. His team used beams of cold polarized neutrons from the National Institute of Standards and Technology (NIST) reactor to bombard a liquid helium target, measuring the parity-violating spin of the beam polarization.

In 2012 he was elected a member of the Washington State Academy of Sciences (WSAS). In 2021 he was awarded, jointly with Eric Adelberger and Jens H. Gundlach, the Breakthrough Prize in Fundamental Physics for “precision fundamental measurements that test our understanding of gravity, probe the nature of dark energy, and establish limits on couplings to dark matter."

His doctoral students include Christopher Stubbs.

Selected publications
 
 
 
 
 
 
  (over 900 citations)

References

External links
 

1953 births
Living people
Harvard University alumni
University of Washington faculty
Experimental physicists
American nuclear physicists
20th-century American physicists
21st-century American physicists
Metrologists
Fellows of the American Physical Society